Karol Beck and Jaroslav Levinský were the defending champions; however, Beck chose to compete in Ostrava instead and Levinský chose not to compete this year.Dustin Brown and Simon Stadler won in the final 7-6(4), 6-7(4), [10-7] against Jonathan Marray and Jamie Murray.

Seeds

Draw

Draw

References
 Doubles Draw

Ixian Grand Aegean Tennis Cup - Doubles
Ixian Grand Aegean Tennis Cup